Ernie England (3 February 1901 – 22 February 1982) was an English footballer who played for Sunderland as a full back. He made his debut for Sunderland on 27 December 1919 against Manchester City in a 1–0 defeat at Hyde Road. Overall, at his time at Sunderland he made 335 league appearances scoring no goals, though he scored 3 own goals, before joining West Ham United in 1931. He made his West Ham debut on 3 January 1931 in a 5–5 against Aston Villa. Making only five appearances for West Ham he left to join Mansfield Town, for whom he made over 150 appearances. In 1936 he joined Frickley and became club captain.

References

1901 births
1982 deaths
English footballers
Sunderland A.F.C. players
West Ham United F.C. players
Mansfield Town F.C. players
Frickley Athletic F.C. players
People from Shirebrook
Footballers from Derbyshire
English Football League players
Association football defenders
Shirebrook Miners Welfare F.C. players